Adriana Cerezo Iglesias (born 24 November 2003) is a Spanish taekwondo athlete who won the silver medal in the 2020 Summer Olympics in Tokyo, Japan/

Career 

She won the gold medal in her debut at the European Taekwondo Championships, at only 17 years old. A month later, she qualified to the 2020 Summer Olympics through the 2021 European Taekwondo Olympic Qualification Tournament, where she ended up in second place, earning a silver medal.

She won the silver medal in the women's 49 kg event at the 2022 Mediterranean Games held in Oran, Algeria.

References 

2003 births
Living people
Spanish female taekwondo practitioners
European Taekwondo Championships medalists
Sportspeople from the Community of Madrid
Taekwondo practitioners at the 2020 Summer Olympics
Medalists at the 2020 Summer Olympics
Olympic silver medalists for Spain
Olympic medalists in taekwondo
People from Alcalá de Henares
Competitors at the 2022 Mediterranean Games
Olympic taekwondo practitioners of Spain
Mediterranean Games silver medalists for Spain
21st-century Spanish women